This is a chronological list of world light heavyweight boxing champions, as recognized by four of the better-known sanctioning organizations:

Championship recognition

1903–1910 
The light-heavyweight division was created in 1903, the brainchild of Chicago journalist Lou Houseman who was also a boxing manager and promoter. He matched his own fighter Jack Root with Kid McCoy and announced the fight as being for the light-heavyweight championship of the world. The boxing press accepted the new weight division and Root was accepted as the inaugural world champion. Jack Root was defeated in his first title defense against George Gardner (boxer), who was considered the most thrilling fighter in the division, and the first undisputed Light - Heavyweight Champion of the World.
During the 1980s, however, some boxing historians found records indicating that Joe Choynski won a twenty-round decision over Jimmy Ryan on August 18, 1899, in a fight billed as being for the light heavyweight championship. Choynski never seems to have made any claim to be the first light heavyweight champion.

 The International Boxing Union (IBU), formed in Paris in 1910. Changed name to European Boxing Union in 1946. It organised world title fights from 1913 to 1963 after which it was incorporated into the World Boxing Council (WBC).
 The New York State Athletic Commission (NYSAC), formed in 1920. It organised world title bouts until the early 1970s when it became a member of World Boxing Council (WBC).
 The National Boxing Association (NBA) formed in the USA in 1921.

1961–present

Championship awarding organizations 
 The World Boxing Association (WBA), founded in 1921 as the National Boxing Association (NBA); it changed its name in 1961 and allowed membership from outside the USA.
 The World Boxing Council (WBC), founded in 1963.
 The International Boxing Federation (IBF), founded in 1983.
 The World Boxing Organization (WBO), founded in 1988.

See also
 List of British world boxing champions

References

External links

 
 World Title Lineages

Light Heavyweight Champions

World boxing champions by weight class